Just Songeon (1880–1940) was a French writer.

1880 births
1940 deaths
French male writers
Franco-Provençal-language writers
20th-century French male writers